HD 117566, also known as HR 5091, is a solitary yellow-hued star located in the northern circumpolar constellation Camelopardalis. It has an apparent magnitude of 5.74, making it faintly visible to the naked eye. At its current distance, HD 117566's brightness is diminished by 0.12 magnitudes due to interstellar dust.

HD 117566 has a stellar classification of G3 IIIb Fe−1 CH1, indicating that it is a G-type giant with an under-abundance of iron and an overabundance of the CH radical in its spectrum. Its evolutionary stage is unclear. A 1994 paper places it in the Hertzsprung gap, indicating it has ceased hydrogen core fusion and is now evolving toward the red giant branch (RGB). However, Mishenina et al. (2006) said that HD 117566 is already past the RGB and is on the horizontal branch, fusing helium at its core. Nevertheless, it has 2.29 times the mass of the Sun and, at the age of 760 million years, it has expanded to 7.2 times the Sun's radius.

References

G-type giants
Carbon stars
High-proper-motion stars
Horizontal-branch stars
Camelopardalis (constellation)
BD+79 00422
117566
065595
5091